Huddersfield Town's 1919–20 campaign was one of the most memorable season in Town's entire history. It could even have been their last, after just 12 years. This was mainly because of plans to amalgamate the club with the new Leeds United team. However, Town's fan bought shares in the team, which saw the team survive and then gain promotion to the top-flight, as well as an appearance in the FA Cup Final against Aston Villa.

Squad at the start of the season

Review
After the end of World War I, the league schedule was returned to its normal status with Town still in Division 2. However, people were starting to wonder what the future would hold for the club after the club's first England international Jack Cock was sold to Chelsea. Then it was revealed that the club was to amalgamate with the new Leeds United team, formed following the demise of Leeds City. But, the people of Huddersfield rallied round and bought £30,000 worth of shares, which saw the club survive for the time being.

Following the club's rescue, the team's form dramatically improved and Town were fighting for an automatic promotion place. This was primarily achieved thanks to a run of losing only 1 out of their last 25 matches. That got them a finishing position of 2nd place behind Tottenham Hotspur.

The season is also noted for the club's first FA Cup Final, reached after beating Brentford, Newcastle United, Plymouth Argyle, Liverpool and Bristol City, before playing Aston Villa in the final at Stamford Bridge, before losing to Billy Kirton's goal in extra time.

Squad at the end of the season

Results

Division Two

FA Cup

Appearances and goals

1919-20
English football clubs 1919–20 season